= Tumarikoppa =

Coordinates: 14°33′N 75°04′E

- Village
- Interactive map of Tumarikoppa
- Country: India
- State: Karnataka
- District: Dharwad

Government
  - Type: Panchayat raj
  - Body: Gram panchayat

Population (2011)
  - Total: 1,355

Languages
  - Official: Kannada
- Time zone: UTC+5:30 (IST)
- ISO 3166 code: IN-KA
- Vehicle registration: KA
- Website: karnataka.gov.in

Tumarikoppa is a village in Dharwad district of Karnataka, India.

== Demographics ==
As of the 2011 Census of India there were 294 households in Tumarikoppa and a total population of 1,355 consisting of 697 males and 658 females. There were 165 children ages 0-6.
